Martha Young may refer to:

Name
 Martha Ellen Young Truman (1852–1947), mother of U.S. president Harry Truman
 Martha Strudwick Young (1862–1941), American writer
 Martha Young-Scholten, linguist

Other
 Young Martha, American collaborative extended play